Letscher is a surname. Notable people with the surname include:

 Brian Letscher, American actor, brother of Matt
 Matt Letscher (born 1970), American actor, director, and playwright

See also
 Letcher (disambiguation)
 Letschert